Calvin Willard Gilfillan (February 20, 1832 – December 2, 1901) was a Republican member of the U.S. House of Representatives from Pennsylvania.

Biography
Calvin W. Gilfillan was born near East Brook, Lawrence County, Pennsylvania.  He attended the common schools and graduated from Westminster College in New Wilmington, Pennsylvania.  He served as superintendent of schools of Mercer County, Pennsylvania, for two terms.  He served as clerk of the Pennsylvania State House of Representatives in 1859.  He studied law, was admitted to the bar in 1859 and commenced practice in Mercer, Pennsylvania.  He was appointed prosecuting attorney for Venango County, Pennsylvania, in 1861 and elected in 1862 for three years.

Gilfillan was elected as a Republican to the Forty-first Congress.  He was an unsuccessful candidate for reelection in 1870.  He practiced law until 1873.  He was later engaged in banking and was a delegate to the 1872 Republican National Convention.  He died in Franklin, Pennsylvania, in 1901.  Interment in the Franklin Cemetery.

Sources

The Political Graveyard

Pennsylvania lawyers
Westminster College (Pennsylvania) alumni
1832 births
1901 deaths
People from Lawrence County, Pennsylvania
County district attorneys in Pennsylvania
Businesspeople from Pennsylvania
Republican Party members of the United States House of Representatives from Pennsylvania
19th-century American politicians
19th-century American businesspeople